Wallace C. Strobel (June 5, 1922 – August 27, 1999) was the subject of a famous photograph during World War II. Strobel, at the time a lieutenant in the 502nd Parachute Infantry Regiment was photographed with General Dwight D. Eisenhower was the night before their jump into Normandy on D-Day, June 6, 1944. The picture captured Eisenhower speaking to paratroopers of the 101st Airborne Division on the eve of the invasion and remains one of the most compelling and classic images from World War II, as well as one of the most famous of General Eisenhower.

Strobel described the photo as follows:

Strobel settled in Saginaw, Michigan after the war. In 2016, his M1911A1 pistol and a collection of captured German pistols were donated to the National WWII Museum in New Orleans. His children attended Douglas MacArthur High School and Dwight D. Eisenhower High School (now Heritage High School) in Saginaw. In 1990, the U.S. Postal Service issued a stamp using this photograph of the historic moment.

References

 The Baltimore Sun (September 5, 1999) by Frederick N. Rasmussen

1922 births
1999 deaths
United States Army personnel of World War II
United States Army officers